Toa Payoh Bus Interchange is located in Toa Payoh, Singapore. It is the first air-conditioned bus interchange in the country, which was completed in 2002 and officially opened by the then Minister for Transport, Yeo Cheow Tong, on 19 May that year. It has a direct connection from the bus interchange to the Toa Payoh MRT station on the North South line.

History

Original interchange
The original interchange was built at a cost of S$2.17 million and opened on 26 December 1983. It replaced a bus terminal that had been in operation since 1971.

Relocation of bus interchange in 1998
When the old Toa Payoh Bus Interchange was demolished on 31 May 1998 to make way for the building of HDB Hub, the new and current headquarters of the Housing and Development Board (HDB) of Singapore, the interchange operator, SBS Transit Ltd, moved its bus operations to a temporary location opposite its original site located at Toa Payoh Town Park, which was upgraded after the temporary interchange was demolished.

Bus interchange located in HDB Hub
Bus services from the temporary bus interchange moved on 19 May 2002, back to the bus interchange original site, which has a direct underground connection to Toa Payoh MRT station. It is notably the first bus interchange in Singapore to be fully air conditioned and it is housed within the building of HDB Hub.

Anti-terrorism exercise
This bus interchange participated in the Exercise Northstar V on 8 January 2020

Bomb hoax
Similar to other bomb hoaxes at Hougang and Jurong East, 21-year-old Lin Zhenghuang was sentenced to 3 months in jail on 7 February 2007 and fined S$4000 for eight charges under the Computer Misuse Act. The charges were for 'mooching' or illegally tapping into his neighbour's unsecured wireless internet network and posting a bomb hoax on an online forum of popular technology site HardwareZone. Lin previously pleaded guilty to one charge under the Telecommunications Act for transmitting a false message and nine charges under the Computer Misuse Act. The accused posted a message on 22 July 2005, reporting that there had been a bomb attack at Toa Payoh Bus Interchange.

Bus contracting model

Under the new bus contracting model, all the bus routes were split into 6 route packages. Bus Service 143 is under Bulim Bus Package, Bus Services 28 and 31 are under Tampines Bus Package, Bus Services 90 and 141 are under Serangoon-Eunos Bus Package, Bus Services 159 and 163 are under Sengkang-Hougang Bus Package, Bus Service 145 is under Bukit Merah Bus Package and the rest of the bus services are under Bishan-Toa Payoh Bus Package.

Currently, Bus Service 143 (Bulim Bus Package) is currently operated by Tower Transit Singapore. All remaining bus services are operated by the anchor operator, SBS Transit.

List of routes

References

External links
 Interchanges and Terminals (SBS Transit)

2002 establishments in Singapore
Toa Payoh
Bus stations in Singapore